The Peel Engineering Company was a manufacturing company based in Peel on the west coast of the Isle of Man that primarily made fibreglass boats through its subsidiary company West Marine Ltd. and fairings for motorcycles.

Description and history
The sports fairings were recognisable for their styling with integral 'blisters' enclosing the handlebar-ends and rider's hands, and were available for racing, named Mountain Mile, with a similar sports-style for road use incorporating a distinctive, large rectangular Cibié headlamp, named Peel 707. A different design was for touring, aptly named TT Tourer.

The company built an experimental hovercraft design in 1961 powered by a 500 cc Triumph engine.

In 1965, Peels arranged for all fairing production to be transferred under licence to Mike Ivory of Luton, Bedfordshire, England. Prototype and development work continued in the Isle of Man.   

Peel Engineering developed the Peel Manxcar concept vehicle, and the Peel P-1000 4 wheeled microcars, and the Peel P50 and Peel Trident 3 wheeled microcars, in addition to the Peel Viking Sport and prototype GRP Minis for BMC. These models constitute the only automobiles manufactured on the Isle of Man; the company ceased manufacture in 1969.

A limited-run Peel Manxkart go-kart was also produced.

The Peel P50 is in the Guinness record as the world's smallest production car.

The Peel Engineering Company referred to in this article later became Peel Engineering Ltd. Originally launched in 1965, it dissolved in 1974 and the brand relaunched in 2010.

See also
 List of car manufacturers of the United Kingdom
 List of microcars

References

External links
 Website of a UK company that produces replicas of some of the original Peel cars
 Owners' club website for owners of original & reproductions of the Peel cars

 
Defunct companies of the Isle of Man
Peel, Isle of Man